Casimir Wang Mi-lu (January 24, 1943 – February 14, 2017) was a Chinese Roman Catholic bishop.

Born in China, Wang Mi-lu was ordained a priest on May 13, 1980. In 1981 he was appointed and on February 20, 1981, was clandestinely consecrated as bishop ordinary of the Roman Catholic Diocese of Qinzhou and served until July 24, 2003.

His younger brother John Baptist Wang Ruo-han is also a clandestine Roman Catholic bishop.

See also

References

1943 births
2017 deaths
20th-century Roman Catholic bishops in China
21st-century Roman Catholic bishops in China